Events from the year 1856 in Denmark.

Incumbents
 Monarch – Frederick VII
 Prime minister – Peter Georg Bang (18 October), Carl Christoffer Georg Andræ

Events
 16 April  Jacob Heinrich Moresco opens a with women's clothing and fashion accessories at Amagertorv 13 in Copenhagen.
 27 April  The Roskuilde–Korsør extension of the Copenhagen–Roskilde Railway is inaugurated.
 13 July  C. K. Hansen is founded.

Undated
 Seamen's Association of 1856 is founded.
 The Ceres Brewery is founded by Malthe Conrad Lottrup in Aarhus.

Births
 18 March – Arnold Krog, designer (died 1931)
 6 September – Hack Kampmann, architect (died 1920)
 28 October – Mary Steen, photographer (died 1939)

Deaths
 16 March – Lauritz Nicolai Hvidt, businessman (born 1777)
 26 March – Johan Laurentz Jensen, painter (born 1800)
 14 July – Michael Gottlieb Bindesbøll, architect (born 1800)
 20 July – Anna Nielsen, mezzo-soprano (died 1803)
 21 July – Emil Aarestrup, poet (born 1800)

References

 
1850s in Denmark
Denmark
Years of the 19th century in Denmark